Dunaway v. New York, 442 U.S. 200 (1979), was a United States Supreme Court case that held a subsequent Miranda warning is not sufficient to cure the taint of an unlawful arrest, when the unlawful arrest led to a coerced confession.

Background 
Dunaway was picked up by Rochester police and taken to the police station for questioning in regards to an attempted robbery and homicide at a pizza parlor. The police did not have probable cause to arrest Dunaway, but had he tried to leave, they would have used force to prevent it. Dunaway was read his rights under Miranda and subsequently confessed.

Supreme Court 
Justice Brennan delivered the opinion of the Court. He stated that the police violated the Fourth and Fourteenth Amendments when they arrested Dunaway without probable cause and took him to the police station for interrogation. This type of detention was determined to intrude on interests protected by the Fourth Amendment. It is therefore necessary to safeguard against illegal arrest. Proper Miranda warnings did not attenuate the misconduct of the police and the confession should have been suppressed.

References

External links
 

1979 in United States case law
United States criminal investigation case law
United States Supreme Court cases
United States Supreme Court cases of the Burger Court